Trevor Jacobs (born July 25, 1976) is an American politician who has served in the Kansas House of Representatives from the 4th district since 2017, and a rancher. He has a Bible outreach ministry with Jesus Saves Ministry and preaches on the radio and elsewhere. He has been described as a far-right conservative, having introduced a bill that would ban abortions in Kansas, criminalizing it with the same penalty as murder.

References

1976 births
Living people
Republican Party members of the Kansas House of Representatives
21st-century American politicians
People from Fort Scott, Kansas